Reginald Dwayne Brown (born September 28, 1974) is a former American football linebacker in the National Football League (NFL). He was drafted in the first round (17th overall) of the 1996 NFL Draft by the Detroit Lions. He played college football at Texas A&M.

Brown suffered a spinal cord contusion in the final game of the 1997 season. The injury nearly left him paralyzed, and it ended his professional football career.

College
Brown played college football for Texas A&M. He earned first team All-Southwest Conference honors for his senior season efforts, during which he recorded 90 tackles and two interceptions.

Professional career
Although not initially expected to be highly drafted, Brown's performance at the NFL combine boosted his stock. Brown was selected 17th overall by the Detroit Lions in the 1996 NFL Draft. In his second season, he recorded 2.5 sacks to go along with two interceptions, both of which went for touchdown returns. Brown ultimately played in 26 games.

In his final game, Brown suffered a spinal cord contusion while assisting on a tackle of New York Jets halfback Adrian Murrell in the final game of the 1997 season, the same game that saw Barry Sanders cross the 2,000-yard mark for the season. He lay motionless for 17 minutes on the turf at the Pontiac Silverdome, briefly losing consciousness, with CPR saving his life. Emergency surgery, rehabilitation, and use of a special back brace saved him from using a wheelchair for the rest of his life.

Post-football career
Brown is mobile and active. In November 2015, Brown gave a presentation hosted by Texas A&M's sports medicine department in which he detailed the recovery from his spinal cord injury.

References

1974 births
Living people
Players of American football from Austin, Texas
American football linebackers
Texas A&M Aggies football players
Detroit Lions players